Donald Eugene Liddle (May 25, 1925 – June 5, 2000) was an American left-handed pitcher in professional baseball who played four seasons in the Major Leagues for the Milwaukee Braves, New York Giants and St. Louis Cardinals from 1953 through 1956.

Liddle is most remembered as the man who, in Game 1 of the 1954 World Series, threw the pitch to Vic Wertz that resulted in The Catch — Giant center fielder Willie Mays' historic back-to-home-plate, over-the-shoulder grab of Wertz' long drive with two men on base in the deepest part of center field at the Giants' home field, the Polo Grounds. Had the ball fallen safely, the opposition Cleveland Indians would have taken the lead 4–2 late in the game. But Mays' catch preserved a 2–2 tie, the Giants won the game in extra innings, and swept the Series in four straight contests.

Wertz was the only batter Liddle faced that day. Reportedly, he commented after the game was over in the locker room, "Well, I got my man", joking about his good fortune and Mays' athletic performance. Liddle later started and won the decisive Game 4 in Cleveland, pitching 6 innings and giving up only one earned run.

Earlier in 1954, Liddle was part of a pivotal, five-player trade, coming to the Giants with fellow left-handed pitcher Johnny Antonelli from the Braves in exchange for 1951 playoff hero Bobby Thomson. Antonelli won 21 games for the 1954 Giants, leading them to the National League pennant, and topped the Senior Circuit in earned run average.

Liddle appeared in 117 Major League games played, 54 as a starting pitcher. In 427 innings, he gave up 397 hits and 203 bases on balls, striking out 198. He retired from baseball after the 1957 season, which he spent in minor league baseball.

Liddle died, aged 75, in his hometown of Mount Carmel, Illinois.

References

External links

1925 births
2000 deaths
Major League Baseball pitchers
Milwaukee Braves players
New York Giants (NL) players
St. Louis Cardinals players
Baseball players from Illinois
Milwaukee Brewers (minor league) players
People from Mount Carmel, Illinois
Mount Vernon Kings players